Noosa Junction Bus Station was opened in August 2011. It is serviced by Kinetic Group bus routes to Sunshine Plaza, Nambour station, Sunrise Beach, Sunshine Beach and Tewantin. It is in Zone 8 of the Translink integrated public transport system.

It is also served by long-distance services to services to Agnes Water, Brisbane, Cairns and Hervey Bay provided by Greyhound Australia and Premier Motor Service.

Bus routes 
The following bus routes services Noosa Junction Bus Station:

References

Bus stations in South East Queensland
Public transport in Sunshine Coast, Queensland